Humibacter antri is a Gram-positive, aerobic and non-motile bacterium from the genus Humibacter which has been isolated from soil from a cave from Jeju in Korea.

References

Microbacteriaceae
Bacteria described in 2013